The 1943 CCNY Beavers football team was an American football team that represented the City College of New York (CCNY) as an independent during the 1943 college football season. In their first season under head coach Leo Miller, the team compiled a 1–3–1 record.

Schedule

References

CCNY
CCNY Beavers football seasons
CCNY Beavers football